Jermaine Phillips (born March 27, 1979) is a former American football safety in the National Football League. He was drafted by the Tampa Bay Buccaneers in the fifth round of the 2002 NFL Draft. He played college football at Georgia.

Phillips earned a Super Bowl ring with the Buccaneers in Super Bowl XXXVII. He also played in the United Football League for the Omaha Nighthawks and Sacramento Mountain Lions.

Jermaine was the Defensive Coordinator at Roswell High School in Roswell, Georgia and helped coach the team to back-to-back GHSA State Finals appearances in 2015 and 2016. He is currently the Defensive Backs Coach for the Pop Warner Junior Pee Wee Youth Football team the Westchase Colts out of Tampa, Florida. He resides in Tampa, Florida with his now divorced wife, Adrianne, and their son Jaedon. his other family like Daylin and cachea.

Early years
Phillips played high school football at Roswell High School in Roswell, Georgia. While there he played line backer, tight end and defensive back. In 1996, he was a first-team All-Area and Area Player of the Year and was named to the Fox Sports All-South second-team.

College career
Phillips played college football at Georgia. From 1998–1999 he was one of Georgia's back up wide receivers. In 2000, he became a strong safety and was third on the team in total tackles with 85 and also had two interceptions. In 2001, Phillips was All-Southeastern Conference first-team selection by the National Sports Bureau after leading his team with three interceptions, four forced fumbles, and second on the team with eighty tackles. He was invited to play in the 2002 Senior Bowl college all-star game. His major was health and physical education.

Professional career
Phillips was drafted by the Tampa Bay Buccaneers in the fifth round (157 overall) of the 2002 NFL Draft. He took over the starting role when long time Buccaneer player John Lynch (who signed with the Denver Broncos) was released because of salary cap issues before the start of the 2004 season. During the 2007 season he had a career-high four interceptions.

An unrestricted free agent in the 2009 offseason, Phillips re-signed with the Buccaneers on March 5. Shortly after, it was reported the Buccaneers would experiment with moving Phillips from safety to weak-side linebacker.

Phillips played in the United Football League for the Omaha Nighthawks in 2010 and Sacramento Mountain Lions in 2011.

NFL statistics

Key
 GP: games played
 COMB: combined tackles
 TOTAL: total tackles
 AST: assisted tackles
 SACK: sacks
 FF: forced fumbles
 FR: fumble recoveries 
 INT: interceptions
 IR YDS: interception return yards
 AVG IR: average interception return
 LNG: longest interception return
 TD: interceptions returned for touchdown
 PD: passes defensed

References

1979 births
Living people
People from Roswell, Georgia
American football safeties
American football linebackers
Georgia Bulldogs football players
Tampa Bay Buccaneers players
Omaha Nighthawks players
Sacramento Mountain Lions players
Sportspeople from Fulton County, Georgia
Players of American football from Georgia (U.S. state)